Obana is a genus of moths of the family Erebidae. The genus was erected by Francis Walker in 1862.

Taxonomy
The Global Lepidoptera Names Index and Butterflies and Moths of the World put this genus in the family Noctuidae.

Species
Obana berioi (Hacker, Fiebig & Stadie, 2019) Ethiopia
Obana biformis (Hacker, Fiebig & Stadie, 2019) Madagascar
Obana cerynoides (Hacker, 2019) Gabon
Obana dinawa (Bethune-Baker, 1906) New Guinea
Obana fascicola (Hacker, 2019) Tanzania, Zimbabwe
Obana fatua (Viette, 1962) Madagascar
Obana festiva (Viette, 1962) Madagascar
Obana gloriosa (Viette, 1956) Madagascar
Obana plagiostola (Hampson, 1896) Bhutan
Obana pusillana (Hacker, Fiebig & Stadie, 2019) Madagascar
Obana rufiplaga (Bethune-Baker, 1906) New Guinea
Obana solomonensis Warren, 1913 Solomons
Obana vagipennata Walker, 1862 Borneo, New Guinea, Queensland
Obana viettei (Berio, 1954) Madagascar, Cameroon, Kenya, Uganda, Tanzania, South Africa
Obana viridicincta (Viette, 1956) Madagascar

References

Acontiinae
Moth genera